Richard Pilger (born 1965) is an American attorney and retired government official who served as the Director of the Election Crimes Branch at the Criminal Division of the United States Department of Justice from March 2010 to November 2020, returning to the civil service position in February 2021 through his retirement in July 2022.  He is currently an unaffiliated private attorney.

Early life and education 
Pilger was born in 1965. Pilger studied English and Philosophy at the University of Notre Dame from 1983 to 1987. In 1990, he earned a Juris Doctor from Indiana University Maurer School of Law in Bloomington, Indiana.

Career 
After law school, Pilger clerked for James T. Moody, a United States District Court Judge. He joined the United States Department of Justice via the Attorney General's Honors Program.

IRS alleged targeting controversy 
Pilger had previously been involved in the IRS targeting controversy, after being linked to Lois Lerner. In 2013, the United States Internal Revenue Service (IRS) revealed that it had selected conservative political groups applying for tax-exempt status for intensive scrutiny based on their names or political themes. Pilger in his capacity as the head of the Election Crimes Branch met with Exempt Organizations Unit director Lois Lerner in October 2010 to discuss the problems of tax exempt groups' spending in the upcoming 2010 midterm election. Subsequent congressional investigations, and a 2017 report by the Treasury Inspector General for Tax Administration found deficient IRS management practices, but no partisan targeting misconduct.

Notable cases 
Prior to assuming his duties for election crimes, Pilger directly handled investigations, prosecutions, and appeals across the complete spectrum of public corruption matters at all levels and in all branches of government. Some of his notable cases include United States v. Spargo, N.D.N.Y. (judicial extortion); United States v. Siegelman & Scrushy, et al., (M.D. Al.) (former Governor and former CEO of HealthSouth convicted of bribery and obstruction of justice); United States v. Plowman, (S.D. Ind.) (Indianapolis city council and police extortion); United States v. Zachares, (D.D.C.) (former senior congressional staffer convicted of honest services fraud involving Jack Abramoff); United States v. West, et al., (E.D. Va.) (fraud and bank theft ring operated by CIA employees); United States v. Carroll, et al., (N.D. Ill.) (first modern conviction of U.S. Foreign Service Officer for overseas bribery conspiracy); Operation Lost Trust, (D.S.C.) (legislative bribery in South Carolina); and Operation BOPTROT, (E.D. Ky.) (legislative bribery in Kentucky); United States v. Newsome, et al., (E.D. Ky.) (vote-buying conspiracy). Pilger has received numerous awards for his corruption prosecutions, including the Attorney General's Distinguished Service Award, and the Assistant Attorney General's Award for Outstanding Trial Advocacy.

2020 election and resignation 
Pilger resigned as Director on November 9, 2020, after United States Attorney General William Barr gave an authorization for federal prosecutors to investigate specific allegations of voter fraud in the 2020 presidential election, going against decades-old guidance to wait until elections were finalized to overtly investigate allegations. Barr's authorization prompted Pilger's resignation letter which described "an important new policy abrogating the forty-year-old Non-Interference Policy for ballot fraud investigations in the period prior to elections becoming certified and uncontested."

He continued at the Department of Justice as a line prosecutor in the Public Integrity Section prosecuting corruption cases until February 2021 when he resumed his role as Director of the Election Crimes Branch and a member of the Section's leadership.

References 

United States Department of Justice officials
Living people
1965 births
University of Notre Dame alumni
Indiana University Maurer School of Law alumni